Antonio Bonetti (1710–1787)  was an Italian painter, active mainly in Bologna in quadratura painting.

Biography
He trained with Serafino Brizzi. He painted in the church of the Madonna del Baraccano in Bologna. In the year of his death, he was elected to the Accademia Clementina. He also decorated a room in the Palazzo Orsi in via San Vitale number 28.

Among his pupils was  Vincenzo Conti.

References

1710 births
1787 deaths
18th-century Italian painters
Italian male painters
Quadratura painters
Painters from Bologna
18th-century Italian male artists